Pocheon Stadium is a multi-purpose stadium in Pocheon, South Korea.  It is currently used mostly for football matches.  The stadium has a capacity of 5,964 seats and was opened in 1990. It was home ground of FC Pocheon.

External links
 Pocheon Sports Facilities Management Center 

Sports venues in Gyeonggi Province
Football venues in South Korea
Multi-purpose stadiums in South Korea
Sports venues completed in 1990
1990 establishments in South Korea
20th-century architecture in South Korea